The World Service Authority (WSA), founded in 1953 by Garry Davis, is a non-profit organization that claims to educate about and promote "world citizenship", "world law", and world government. It is best known for selling unofficial fantasy documents such as World Passports.

Organization
The WSA has an office in Washington, D.C., the United States. The office in Shanghai, China, was closed on 1 January 2010. , attorney David M. Gallup was the president of the WSA.

History
The WSA was founded by Garry Davis, a former Broadway actor and World War II bomber pilot, who officially gave up his U.S. citizenship in 1948 to live as a "citizen of the world". It was set up to be the administrative agency of the "World Government of World Citizens" which he declared on 4 September 1953. The first office was opened in New York City in 1954. In the past, WSA also had offices in Basel, London and Tokyo.

Activities
Besides selling World Passports, the WSA registers customers as "world citizens" and sells "world citizen" identity documents, such as fantasy birth certificates, identity cards, marriage certificates, political asylum cards, "International Exit Visas" and "International Residence Permits". The organization's legal department is responsible to assist holders of its documents.  The organization also promotes programs, such as "Mundialization" – declaring cities and towns as "world territories"; "World Syntegrity Project" – an attempt to create a world constitution through meetings of citizens; and other programs.

The WSA is also involved in a project to establish a World Court of Human Rights.  The WSA has also allegedly sold World Government Postal Stamps, which, according to Garry Davis, helped to convey thousands of letters between China and Taiwan in the early 1980s.

See also
Bitnation
Commonwealth of World Citizens
World Passport

References

External links
 World Service Authority official website
 

World government
Organizations based in Washington, D.C.
Global citizenship
Organizations established in 1954
1954 establishments in Washington, D.C.
Organizations based in Shanghai